The Battle of Najaf was fought between United States and Iraqi forces on one side and the Mahdi Army led by Muqtada al-Sadr on the other in the Iraqi city of Najaf in August 2004.

Background
On 31 July 2004, the 11th Marine Expeditionary Unit, under the Polish-led Multinational Division Central-South (MND-CS), assumed operational control of An Najaf and Al-Qadisiyyah provinces from Task Force Dragon, which was composed of elements of the 1st Infantry Division.  Task Force Dragon had earlier (June 2004) relieved the 2nd Armored Cavalry Regiment who had been extended twice in Iraq. A platoon from the 66th Military Police company had been in Najaf since March and was one of the only American units in Najaf before this time. The platoon was working with the Iraqi Police to rebuild and train the police force in this area and was under siege along with soldiers from the El Salvadorian Army until the 2nd Armored Cavalry Regiment arrived.

The MEU and the Mahdi Army first exchanged fire on 2 August. A patrol by Combined Anti-Armor Team (CAAT) Alpha, Weapons Company, 1st Battalion, 4th Marines (1/4) approached a maternity clinic located directly across the street from the home of Muqtada al-Sadr on the outskirts of the city. The clinic was in an area authorized for U.S. presence under a June cease-fire agreement brokered between coalition forces and Muqtada Sadr by the governor of Najaf, other local civic leaders, and the Bayt al-Shia (the informal council of senior Shia clerics). The Marines reported over 70 enemy dead after nearly an hour of fighting. The Mahdi Army kept a steady resupply of men and weapons coming out of the Wadi-us-Salaam cemetery. CAAT Alpha faced mortars, RPGs (Rocket Propelled Grenades) and small arms fire with one Marine wounded until the unit ran low on ammunition. 1/4's Bravo Company was sent in on 7-ton trucks to provide covering fire for CAAT Alpha. Both sides withdrew to their respective strongholds soon afterwards.

Akram al-Kaabi, the founder and leader of Harakat Hezbollah al-Nujaba, said that the IRGC and Lebanese Hezbollah helped the militant forces of the Mahdi Army in this battle. He said that IRGC and Hezbollah officers were present on the ground and helped during the battle.

Battle
Major conflict began on 5 August, when the Mahdi Army (MA) attacked an Iraqi Police Station at 1 am. Their first attack was repelled  but the MA regrouped and attacked again at 3 am.  Soon after, a quick reaction force (QRF) from the Marine Expeditionary Unit (B 1/4) was dispatched at the request of the governor of An Najaf. Around 11 am the QRF came under heavy machine gun and mortar fire from the Mahdi Army within the Wadi-us-Salaam, the largest cemetery in the Muslim world approximately 7 miles squared. The cemetery has been layered over the centuries resulting in large underground tombs, tunnels and surface monuments, many reaching two stories tall. The Marines from 1/4 fought across this inhospitable terrain and under it in some of the first tunnel fighting seen since Vietnam.

A U.S. Marine UH-1N helicopter was shot down by small-arms fire on the second day of the fighting while conducting a close air support mission over enemy positions, the crew survived. Four U.S. military personnel were killed during the heavy street battles fought between the Mahdi Army and U.S. and Iraqi forces, until the MEU withdrew temporarily on 7 August
During the fighting, half a dozen U.S. Abrams tanks and Bradley fighting vehicles were damaged or disabled by insurgent RPG fire in the narrow streets. 

Fighting began in the city centre and then moved through the cemetery. After several days the fighting shifted to the environs of the Imam Ali Mosque when the Mahdi Army withdrew and took refuge there. Marines from B Co. 1-4 encircled the complex after fighting through the Old City and began a siege. The Mahdi Army utilized large hotels that overlook the cemetery as overwatch machine gun positions. Marines from Alpha and Bravo Co.  1-4 assaulted several of these hotels. After heavy hand to hand and room to room fighting the hotels were secured, relieving elements of Charlie Co. who were pinned down in the cemetery.  There were not enough Marines however to properly hold the hotels and they were consolidated to two adjoining ones. The fighting damaged two of the minarets of the mosque, one of the holiest of all Shiite shrines. (Although neighboring buildings suffered considerable damage, the mosque itself suffered only superficial damage from stray bullets and shrapnel).

On 23 August, at least 15 explosions, many sounding like artillery shells, rocked the area, as shrapnel fell in the courtyard of the gold-domed mosque and gunfire echoed through the alleyways. On 26 August 2004, two F-16s flying out of Balad dropped four 2000 pound JDAMs (Joint Direct Attack Munitions) on two hotels near the shrine which were being used by the insurgents. The successful airstrike dealt a devastating blow to Sadr and led to a hasty settlement with Grand Ayatollah Sistani the following morning which allowed Al-Sadr and the remnants of his militia to leave Najaf. This arrangement was favorable to the Americans because it relieved them of the need to enter the Imam Ali Mosque. The Marines of 1-4 lined the street watching Sadr's Mahdi Army leave the mosque.

Aftermath
The battle ended on 27 August 2004 with a negotiated ceasefire: Mahdi army fighters surrendered their weapons before leaving and none of them were detained; Marine battalion 1/4 and the Iraqi police took control of the security in the city. Sporadic fighting continued for some months. Some MA fighters from Najaf went to Sadr City in Baghdad, where there had also been heavy fighting, to help the Mahdi Army in their guerrilla activities against U.S. and Iraqi forces. A final agreement between the U.S. and Muqtada al-Sadr was reached by the end of September and fighting ceased in early October. Fighting spread to Najaf province and lasted for several more months before finally winding down.

Notes

References
 Camp, R. D. (2011). Battle for the city of the dead: In the shadow of the Golden Dome, Najaf, August 2004. Minneapolis, Minn: Zenith Press.
Iraqi, U.S. forces battle al-Sadr's militia CNN, 5 August 2004
11th MEU Press Release USMC, 31 July 2004
11th MEU Press Release USMC, 2 August 2004
11th MEU Press Release USMC, 5 August 2004
11th MEU Press Release USMC, 5 August 2004
11th MEU Press Release USMC, 7 August 2004
11th MEU Press Release USMC, 9 August 2004
najafproject.iespana.es

Conflicts in 2004
2004 in Iraq
Battles of the Iraq War in 2004
Battles of the Iraq War involving the United States
Battles of the Iraq War involving Iraq
Urban warfare
Najaf
United States Marine Corps in the Iraq War
August 2004 events in Iraq